The following is a partial bibliography of the writings of L. Ron Hubbard (1911–1986).

Fiction

Under the Black Ensign (1935)
Buckskin Brigades (1937), 
Slaves of Sleep (1939)
Ultimate Adventure, the (1939)
Final Blackout (1940), 
Indigestible Triton, the (1940)
The Automagic Horse (1940) published (1994)
The End Is Not Yet (1947) (serialized in Astounding Science Fiction, no book publication reported
Death's Deputy (1948)
The Kingslayer (1949)
Dianetics (1950)
To the Stars (1950)
The Masters of Sleep (1950)
Fear (1951), 
Typewriter in the Sky (1951), 
Return to Tomorrow (1954)
The Ultimate Adventure (1970)
Ole Doc Methuselah (1953), 
Seven Steps to the Arbiter (1975)
Revolt in the Stars (1979 - Unpublished)
Battlefield Earth (1982), 
Mission Earth 1. The Invaders Plan (1985)
Mission Earth 2. Black Genesis (1986)
Mission Earth 3.The Enemy Within (1986)
Mission Earth 4. An Alien Affair (1986)
Mission Earth 5. Fortune of Fear (1986)
Mission Earth 6. Death Quest (1986)
Mission Earth 7. Voyage of Vengeance (1987)
Mission Earth 8. Disaster (1987)
Mission Earth 9. Villainy Victorious (1987)
Mission Earth 10. The Doomed Planet (1987)

Short fiction
Hubbard's short fiction was published in pulp magazines. The following is an incomplete list of the publications:

Hell Job Series, Argosy, 11 July 1936
Mr. Luck, Argosy, 3 October 1936
Deep Sea Driver, Argosy 24 October 1936
The Big Cats, Argosy 31 October 1936
River Driver,  Argosy, 7 November 1936
Mountaineer, Argosy, 6 February 1937
Tinhorn's Daughter, Western Romances, December 1937
The Dangerous Dimension, Astounding Science Fiction, July 1938,
When Gilhooly Was in Flower, Romantic Range, August 1938 (as Barry Randolph)
The Tramp (Part 1), Astounding Science Fiction, September 1938,
The Tramp (Part 2), Astounding Science Fiction, October 1938,
The Tramp (Part 3), Astounding Science Fiction, November 1938
General Swamp, C.I.C. (Part 1), Astounding Science Fiction, Aug 1939 (as Frederick Engelhardt)
General Swamp, C.I.C. (Part 2), Astounding Science Fiction, Sep 1939 (as Frederick Engelhardt)
This Ship Kills!,  Astounding Science Fiction, November 1939 (as Frederick Engelhardt)
Danger in the Dark, Unknown, May 1939
The Ghoul, Unknown, August 1939
Vanderdecken, Unknown, December 1939 (as Frederick Engelhardt)
The Professor Was a Thief, Astounding Science Fiction, February 1940
Final Blackout (Part 1), Astounding Science Fiction, April 1940,
Final Blackout (Part 2), Astounding Science Fiction, May 1940,
Final Blackout (Part 3), Astounding Science Fiction, June 1940,
The Kraken, Unknown Fantasy Fiction, June 1940 (as Frederick Engelhardt)
Fear, Unknown Fantasy Fiction, July 1940
The Idealist, Astounding Science Fiction, July 1940 (as Kurt von Rachen)
The Kilkenny Cats, Astounding Science Fiction, September 1940 (as Kurt von Rachen)
The Devil's Rescue, Unknown Fantasy Fiction, October 1940,
One Was Stubborn, Unknown Fantasy Fiction, October 1940 (as Rene La Fayette)
One Was Stubborn, Astounding Science Fiction, November 1940 (as Rene La Fayette)
Typewriter in the Sky (Part 1), Unknown Fantasy Fiction, November 1940
Typewriter in the Sky (Part 2), Unknown Fantasy Fiction, December 1940
The Traitor, Astounding Science Fiction, January 1941 (as Kurt von Rachen)
History Class, 2133 A.D., Thrilling Wonder Stories, January 1941 (as Frederick Engelhardt)
The Crossroads, Unknown Fantasy Fiction, February 1941, (1941)
The Mutineers, Astounding Science Fiction, April 1941, (as Kurt von Rachen)
The Case of the Friendly Corpse Unknown Fantasy Fiction, August 1941,
Borrowed Glory, Unknown Worlds, October 1941, (1941)
The Last Drop, Astonishing Stories, November 1941, (with L. Sprague de Camp)
The Invaders, Astounding Science Fiction, January 1942,
The Rebels, Astounding Science Fiction, February 1942, (as Kurt von Rachen)
He Didn't Like Cats, Unknown Worlds, February 1942
The Room, Unknown Worlds, April 1942,
Strain, Astounding Science Fiction, April 1942,
The Slaver, Astounding Science Fiction, June 1942,
Space Can, Astounding Science Fiction, July 1942
The Beast, Astounding Science Fiction, October 1942
The Great Secret, Science Fiction Stories, April 1943
The End is Not Yet (part 1 of 3), Astounding Science Fiction, August 1947
The End is Not Yet (part 2 of 3), Astounding Science Fiction, September 1947
The End is Not Yet (part 3 of 3), Astounding Science Fiction, October 1947
Ole Doc Methuselah, Astounding Science Fiction, October 1947 (as René Lafayette)
The Expensive Slaves, Astounding Science Fiction, November 1947 (as René Lafayette)
Her Majesty's Aberration, Astounding Science Fiction, March 1948 (as René Lafayette)
The Obsolete Weapon, Astounding Science Fiction, May 1948
The Great Air Monopoly, Astounding Science Fiction, September 1948, (as René Lafayette)
When Shadows Fall, Startling Stories, July 1948,
240,000 Miles Straight Up, Thrilling Wonder Stories, December 1948
Forbidden Voyage, Startling Stories, January 1949, (as René Lafayette)
The Magnificent Failure, Startling Stories, March 1949, (as René Lafayette)
Plague!, Astounding Science Fiction, April 1949, (as René Lafayette)
The Conroy Diary, Astounding Science Fiction, May 1949, (as René Lafayette)
The Incredible Destination, Startling Stories, May 1949, (as René Lafayette)
A Sound Investment, Astounding Science Fiction, June 1949, (as René Lafayette)
The Unwilling Hero, Startling Stories, July 1949, (as René Lafayette)
A Matter of Matter, Astounding Science Fiction, August 1949,
Beyond the Black Nebula, Startling Stories, September 1949, (as René Lafayette)
The Automagic Horse, Astounding Science Fiction, October 1949
The Planet Makers, Thrilling Wonder Stories, October 1949,
The Emperor of the Universe, Startling Stories, November 1949, (as René Lafayette)
A Can of Vacuum, Astounding Science Fiction, December 1949
The Last Admiral, Startling Stories, January 1950, (as René Lafayette)
Beyond All Weapons, Super Science Stories, January 1950
Ole Mother Methuselah, Astounding Science Fiction, January 1950 (as René Lafayette)
To the Stars (part 1 of 2), Astounding Science Fiction, February 1950
To the Stars (part 2 of 2), Astounding Science Fiction, March 1950
Greed, Astounding Science Fiction, April 1950,
Battling Bolto, Thrilling Wonder Stories, August 1950,
The Final Enemy, Super Science Stories, September 1950,
Tough Old Man, Startling Stories, November 1950,
Dianomitry, Astounding Science Fiction, January 1951

Short story collections

Beginning in the 1990s Author Services began publishing volumes of Hubbard's short fiction organized by genre (Adventure, Mystery/Suspense, Science Fiction, Western, etc.) At least 42 volumes were published.  The following information comes from the Library of Congress's Online Catalog, with supplemental information from www.bookfinder.com

Adventure Stories
V1-Five mex for a million ; Price for a hat ; The cossack
V2-The black sultan ; The barbarians—Red Sand
V3-The trail of the red diamonds ; Golden hell ; Tomb of the ten thousand dead
V4-Starch and stripes ; Trick soldier ; Mr. Tidwell, gunner --
V5-Tah ; Grounded ; Yellow loot ; Red death over China --
V6-The squad that never came back ; The adventure of "X" ; Escape for three --
V7-The sky devil ; He walked to war ; The crate killer --
V8-Yukon madness ; Medals for Mahoney ; Wings over Ethiopia --
V9-Catapult courage ; Raiders of the beam ; Boomerang bomber --
V10-The green god ; Machine gun 21,000 ; Fifty-Fifty O’Brien
V11-Pearl pirate ; The drowned city ; The small boss of Nunaloha

Fantasy Stories
V1-The crossroads ; The devil's rescue ; The room
V2-The dangerous dimension ; The professor was a thief ; The last drop ; He didn't like cats
V3-Danger in the Dark; Borrowed Glory; If I Were You

Hell Job Series
V1-Sleepy McGee ; Don't rush me ; Mr. Luck
V2-Test pilot ; Deep-sea diver ; The big cats
V3-River driver ; The ethnologist ; Mine inspector
V4-The shooter ; Steeplejack ; Flying trapeze
V5-Mountaineer ; A lesson in lightning ; Nine lives

Mystery/Suspense Stories
V1-Calling squad cars! ; The blow torch murder ; The grease spot ; Killer's law --
V2-Dead men kill ; Mouthpiece ; The mad dog murder
V3-The death flyer ; They killed him dead ; The slickers

Ole Doc Methuselah Stories
V1-Ole Doc Methuselah ; Her Majesty's aberration ; The expensive slaves ; The great air monopoly
V2-Plague! ; A sound investment ; Ole Mother Methuselah.

Science Fiction Stories
V1-240,000 miles straight up ; The were-human ; He found God
V2-The obsolete weapon ; The planet makers ; Beyond all weapons
V3-Battle of wizards ; A can of vacuum ; Tough old man
V4-One was stubborn ; A matter of matter ; Greed
V5-STRAIN; THE SLAVER; SPACE CAN; FINAL ENEMY
V6-The great secret ; The automagic horse ; Battling Bolto

Western Stories
V1-Hoss tamer ; Stranger in town ; The ghost town gun-ghost
V2-The toughest ranger ; The bad one ; Marriage for spite ; Horse and horse
V3-Tinhorn's daughter ; Johnny, the town tamer
V4-The baron of Coyote River ; Man for breakfast ; Blood on his spurs
V5-The neck scarf ; The no-gun gunhawk ; Devil's manhunt --
V6-Maybe because--! ; "Tooby" ; Plans for the boy ; Under the Diehard brand
V7-Canteens! ; Ride 'em, cowboy ; The ranch that no one would buy
V8-When Gilhooly was in flower ; Boss of the Lazy B ; Ruin at Rio Piedras
V9-Come and get it ; Death waits at sundown ; Cattle king for a day
V10-Leaducation ; Reign of the Gila monster ; Gun boss of the Tumbleweed
V11-King of the gunmen ; Silent paards ; Shadows from Boot Hill ; Gunman!--
V12-The magic quirt ; Stacked bullets ; The Gunner from Gehenna

Scientology and Dianetics

Adaptations by other authors
Ai! Pedrito! When Intelligence Goes Wrong by Kevin J. Anderson (1998), 
A Very Strange Trip by Dave Wolverton (1999),

References

Bibliographies by writer
Bibliographies of American writers
 
Science fiction bibliographies